Wind Tower is a skyscraper in Downtown Miami, Florida, United States. It was completed in early 2008 and, it is the third skyscraper within the River Front East complex, on the north bank of the Miami River. The structure is located on the northeastern most quadrant of the complex, with most proximity to the intersection of SE 3rd Street and Miami Avenue.

Standing at 501 ft (153 m) tall, the tower has a total of 41 floors. The ground level is used for retail space and the main entrance and lobby areas. The garage utilizes floors 2 through 8, with high security and restricted to residents only. The 9th and 10th houses the building's recreation center, consisting of a pool area, racquetball court, fitness and spas and wellness facilities. Floors 11-41 are used for the standard residential units, while floors 3, 5 and 7 house a limited number of double-floor lofts.

The architect is Revuelta Vega Leon, who also designed the rest of the River Front East complex.

See also
List of tallest buildings in Miami
River Front East

Gallery

Residential buildings completed in 2008
Residential skyscrapers in Miami
2008 establishments in Florida